Nerviano is a comune (municipality) in the northwestern part of the Metropolitan City of Milan in the Italian region Lombardy, located about  northwest of downtown Milan. Its territory is crossed by the Olona river and by the Villoresi Canal.

References

External links
 Official website

Cities and towns in Lombardy